Einar Antonio Díaz (born December 28, 1972) is a Panamanian professional baseball player and coach currently a coach for the AAA Gwinnett Stripers. Díaz played in Major League Baseball (MLB) as a catcher for the Cleveland Indians, Texas Rangers, Montreal Expos, St. Louis Cardinals, and Los Angeles Dodgers from 1996 through 2006.

Playing career
From -, Díaz was the primary starting catcher for the Cleveland Indians. Following the 2002 season, he was traded to the Texas Rangers to replace All-Star catcher Iván Rodríguez, who left for free agency. This was the last starting job Díaz would see.

Díaz made a pitching appearance for the Bisons on June 4, 2006, and was the losing pitcher of record that game. 

Díaz never played with the Indians in his second stint with the organization in 2006. On August 12, 2006, he was traded to the Los Angeles Dodgers (as the Dodgers were in need of another backup catcher after Sandy Alomar Jr. was traded). Díaz would only compile 3 at-bats as a Dodger, collecting 2 hits in those 3 at-bats.

At the conclusion of the 2006 season, Díaz signed a minor league contract with the Pittsburgh Pirates and was assigned to their Indianapolis Triple-A club at the end of  spring training. On June 30, 2007, while scoring from third on a Brad Eldred multiple RBI hit, Díaz suffered a total rupture of his patellar tendon when he crossed home plate, forcing him to miss the remainder of the season.

Coaching career
Diaz retired at the end of the 2007 season. On January 12, the Orioles named him the manager of the Rookie League Bluefield Orioles. He was previously the batting coach for the Delmarva Shorebirds. The Orioles promoted Diaz to assistant hitting coach on April 1, 2013. The entire coaching staff was fired after the 2018 season.

Diaz was named as a coach for the AAA Gwinnett Stripers for the 2019 season.

References

External links
, or Retrosheet, or Baseball Reference (Minor and Winter Leagues)

1972 births
Living people
Baltimore Orioles coaches
Buffalo Bisons (minor league) players
Burlington Indians players (1986–2006)
Canton-Akron Indians players
Cardenales de Lara players
Panamanian expatriate baseball players in Venezuela
Cleveland Indians players
Columbus Red Stixx players
Indianapolis Indians players
Kinston Indians players
Las Vegas 51s players
Los Angeles Dodgers players
Lynchburg Hillcats players
Mahoning Valley Scrappers players
Major League Baseball catchers
Major League Baseball players from Panama
Minor league baseball coaches
Minor league baseball managers
Montreal Expos players
Panamanian expatriate baseball players in the United States
Panamanian expatriate baseball players in Canada
People from Chiriquí Province
St. Louis Cardinals players
Texas Rangers players